George Kirk may refer to:

 George Kirk (MP) (1831–1912), Irish Home Rule League politician
 George Washington Kirk (1837–1905), soldier who served in American Civil War
 George Kirk (Star Trek), fictional father of the character James T. Kirk, from Star Trek